Perserikatan Sepakbola Tanggamus or PS Tanggamus is an Indonesian football team based in Tanggamus Regency, Lampung. They currently competes in Liga 3.

Honours
 U-17 Soeratin Cup Lampung
 Champions: 2016, 2017, 2021

References

External links

Football clubs in Indonesia
Football clubs in Lampung
1997 establishments in Indonesia
Association football clubs established in 1997